This is a list of notable anime directors. Romanized names are written in Western order (given names before family names), whereas kanji names are written in Japanese order (family names before given names).

Individuals

A

D

H

I

K

M

N

O

R

S

T

Y

See also

 List of Japanese animation studios

References

Lists of filmmakers
Anime directors